Tengku Ampuan Hajah Afzan Rahimahallah binti Almarhum Tengku Panglima Perang Tengku Muhammad (Jawi: تڠكو امڤوان حاجه  افضان رحمة ﷲ بنت المرحوم تڠكو ڤڠليما ڤرڠ تڠکو محمد) 4 December 1932 – 29 June 1988) was the Tengku Ampuan of Pahang. She served as Raja Permaisuri Agong of Malaysia between 26 April 1979 and 25 April 1984.

Early life
Born on 4 December 1932 in Kuala Terengganu, she was the fourth child of Tengku Muhammad ibni Almarhum Sultan Ahmad Al-Mu’adzam Shah and Tengku Hajah Mandak binti Tengku Mustafa, and the granddaughter of Almarhum Sultan Ahmad Shah, the first Sultan of Pahang.

Her father, the son of Sultan Ahmad of Pahang, served as Chief Minister of Terengganu before returning to Pahang to hold the same post.

Tengku Hajah Afzan received her early education at the Malay Girls’ School in Pekan. She also received private tuition in English.

Marriage and becoming queen
On 22 April 1954, at the age of 22, she married Ahmad Shah, Crown Prince of Pahang, at Kuala Lipis and became the Tengku Puan of Pahang. She gave birth to seven children, two boys and five girls, including the sixth and current Sultan of Pahang and the sixteenth Yang Di Pertuan Agong of Malaysia, Al-Sultan Abdullah Ri'ayatuddin Al-Mustafa Billah Shah, Tengku Meriam, Tengku Muhaini, Tengku Aishah, Tengku Abdul Rahman, Tengku Nong Fatimah and Tengku Shahariah.

In 1974, when Ahmad Shah ascended to the throne of Pahang, she became his queen consort (Tengku Ampuan). She was Raja Permaisuri Agong of Malaysia (queen consort of the elected leader) between 1979 and 1984.

Death
Tengku Afzan died on 29 June 1988 at 8:42 am at Istana Pahang, Kuala Lumpur at the age of 55 due to cancer. She was laid to rest at the Pahang Royal Mausoleum near Abu Bakar Royal Mosque in Pekan, Pahang.

Awards and recognitions
She has been awarded :

Honours of Pahang
  Member 1st class of the Family Order of the Crown of Indra of Pahang (DK I, 6 May 1975)
  Grand Knight of the Order of Sultan Ahmad Shah of Pahang (SSAP)
  Grand Knight of the Order of the Crown of Pahang  (SIMP, 29 May 1972)

National and Sultanal honour
  (as wife of the Yang di-Pertuan Agong, 29 March 1979 – 25 April 1984) : 
  Recipient of the Order of the Crown of the Realm (DMN, 29 May 1979)

Foreign honour
  : First Class of the Order of Tudor Vladimirescu (25 November 1982)

Places named after her
Several places named after her, including:
 Tengku Ampuan Afzan Mosque in Kuantan, Pahang
 Tengku Ampuan Afzan Hospital in Kuantan, Pahang
 Institut Tengku Ampuan Afzan, a child development centre in Kuala Lumpur
 Institut Pendidikan Guru Kampus Tengku Ampuan Afzan in Kuala Lipis, Pahang
 SM Tengku Ampuan Afzan, a secondary school in Chenor, Pahang
 SMK Tengku Afzan, a secondary school in Kuantan, Pahang
 SMKA Tengku Ampuan Hajjah Afzan, a secondary school in Jerantut, Pahang
 Maahad Tahfiz Al Quran Wal Qiraat Tengku Ampuan Afzan, Pekan, Pahang
 Taman Tengku Ampuan Afzan, a residential area in Lanchang, Pahang

See also
Yang di-Pertuan Agong
Raja Permaisuri Agong

References

1932 births
1988 deaths
Deaths from cancer in Malaysia
Malaysian people of Malay descent
Malaysian Muslims
Royal House of Pahang
Pahang royal consorts
Malaysian royal consorts
Malaysian queens consort
Recipients of the Order of the Crown of the Realm
First Classes of the Family Order of the Crown of Indra of Pahang